Pseudocalotes khaonanensis is a species of agamid lizard. It is the largest species in the genus Pseudocalotes and can reach  in snout–vent length. Endemic to Thailand, it is found only in the Khao Nan Mountains in Khao Nan National Park, located in the Nakhon Si Thammarat Province of Southern Thailand.  Found at high elevation (above  a.s.l.) in cloud/montane forests in the stunted tree growth associated with this habitat, in trees rich with epiphyte growth.

References

Pseudocalotes
Lizards of Asia
Reptiles of Thailand
Endemic fauna of Thailand
Reptiles described in 2008
Taxa named by Tanya Chan-ard
Taxa named by Michael Cota
Taxa named by Sunchai Makchai
Taxa named by Suttinee Lhaotaew